Rua Ngatikaura (born 27 May 2000) is a Cook Islands international rugby league footballer who plays as a  for the Wests Tigers in the NRL.

Background
Ngatikaura was born in Auckland, New Zealand. He is of Cook Islands descent.

Playing career

Club career
Ngatikaura came through the youth system at the Wests Tigers, playing for the Western Suburbs in the Harold Matthews Cup between 2015 and 2016, before moving onto the S. G. Ball Cup side in 2017. He played for the Wests Tigers in their Jersey Flegg Cup side between 2018 and 2021. He captained the side and was named player of the year in 2021.

He played for the Wests Tigers in Trial matches before the start of the 2022 NRL season.

Ngatikaura was promoted to the Wests Tigers top squad ahead of the 2023 NRL season.

International career
In 2022 Ngatikaura was named in the Cook Islands squad for the 2021 Rugby League World Cup.

References

External links
Wests Tigers profile
Cook Islands profile

2000 births
Living people
Cook Islands national rugby league team players
Western Suburbs Magpies NSW Cup players
New Zealand rugby league players
New Zealand sportspeople of Cook Island descent
Rugby league players from Auckland
Rugby league hookers